The National Cartoonists Society (NCS) is an organization of professional cartoonists in the United States. It presents the National Cartoonists Society Awards. The Society was born in 1946 when groups of cartoonists got together to entertain the troops. They enjoyed each other's company and decided to meet on a regular basis.

NCS members work in many branches of the profession, including advertising, animation, newspaper comic strips and syndicated single-panel cartoons, comic books, editorial cartoons, gag cartoons, graphic novels,  greeting cards, magazine and book illustration. Only recently has the National Cartoonists Society embraced web comics.  Membership is limited to established professional cartoonists, with a few exceptions of outstanding persons in affiliated fields. The NCS is not a guild or labor union.

The organization's stated primary purposes are "to advance the ideals and standards of professional cartooning in its many forms", "to promote and foster a social, cultural and intellectual interchange among professional cartoonists of all types" and "to stimulate and encourage interest in and acceptance of the art of cartooning by aspiring cartoonists, students and the general public."

History
The National Cartoonists Society had its origins during World War II when cartoonists Gus Edson, Otto Soglow, Clarence D. Russell, Bob Dunn and others did chalk talks at hospitals for the USO in 1943. Edson recalled, “We played two spots. Fort Hamilton and Governor’s Island. And then we quit the USO.” They were lured away by choreographer and former Rockette Toni Mendez. When she learned of these chalk talks, she recruited the cartoonists to do shows for the Hospital Committee of the American Theatre Wing. Beginning with a performance emceed by humor columnist Bugs Baer at Halloran Hospital on Staten Island, these shows were produced and directed by Mendez. The group expanded to junkets on military transport planes, flying to military bases along the southeastern seaboard. On one of those flights, Russell proposed a club to Rube Goldberg and others so the group could still get together after WWII ended. Mendez recalled:

The Society was organized on a Friday evening, March 1, 1946, when 26 cartoonists gathered at 7pm in the Barberry Room on East 52nd Street in Manhattan. After drinks and dinner, they voted to determine officers and a name for their new organization. It was initially known as The Cartoonists Society. Goldberg was elected president with Russell Patterson as vice president, C. D. Russell as secretary and Milton Caniff, treasurer. Soglow was later added as second vice president (“to follow the first vice president around”). Mendez functioned as the Society's trouble-shooter and later became an agent representing more than 50 cartoonists.

The 26 founding members came from the group of 32 members who had paid dues by March 13, including strip cartoonists Wally Bishop (Muggs and Skeeter), Martin Branner (Winnie Winkle), Ernie Bushmiller (Nancy), Milton Caniff, Gus Edson (The Gumps), Ham Fisher (Joe Palooka), Harry Haenigsen (Penny), Fred Harman (Red Ryder), Bill Holman (Smokey Stover), Jay Irving (Willie Doodle), Stan MacGovern (Silly Milly), Al Posen (Sweeney and Son), Clarence Russell (Pete the Tramp), Otto Soglow (The Little King), Jack Sparling (Claire Voyant), Raeburn Van Buren (Abbie an' Slats), Dow Walling (Skeets) and Frank Willard (Moon Mullins).

Also among the early 32 members were syndicated panel cartoonists Dave Breger (Mister Breger), George Clark (The Neighbors), Bob Dunn (Just the Type) and Jimmy Hatlo (They'll Do It Every Time); freelance magazine cartoonists Abner Dean and Mischa Richter, editorial cartoonists Rube Goldberg (New York Sun), Burris Jenkins (New York Journal American), C. D. Batchelor (Daily News) and Richard Q. Yardley (The Baltimore Sun); sports cartoonist Lou Hanlon; illustrator Russell Patterson and comic book artists Joe Shuster and Joe Musial.

By March 1947, the NCS had 112 members, including Bud Fisher (Mutt and Jeff), Don Flowers (Glamor Girls), Bob Kane (Batman), Fred Lasswell (Barney Google and Snuffy Smith), George Lichty (Grin and Bear It), Zack Mosley (The Adventures of Smilin' Jack), Alex Raymond (Rip Kirby), Cliff Sterrett (Polly and Her Pals) and Chic Young (Blondie), plus editorial cartoonists Reg Manning and Fred O. Seibel and sports cartoonist Willard Mullin.

Marge Devine Duffy, a secretary in King Features public relations department, had been helping Russell handle correspondence to the NCS, and in 1948, she was installed as the official NCS secretary and later given the title Scribe of the Society. Her name was on all the Society’s publications, and her address was the permanent mailing address of the NCS for more than 30 years. As the organizing secretary, she handled agendas, organization and publicity. “She practically ran the damn thing,” Caniff recalled. “A real autocrat, and everyone was delighted to have her be an autocrat because that’s what we needed.”

In the fall of 1949, the NCS cooperated with the Treasury Department to sell savings bonds, embarking in a nationwide tour to 17 major cities with teams of 10 or 12 cartoonists and a traveling display, 20,000 Years of Comics, a 95-foot pictorial history of the comic strip.

Despite the contributions of Duffy and Mendez, there were no female members, as stipulated in the NCS' constitution which specified that “any cartoonist (male) who signs his name to his published work” could apply for membership. In 1949, Hilda Terry wrote a letter challenging that rule, and after more than six months of debates and votes, three women were finally admitted for membership in 1950—Terry, Edwina Dumm and gag cartoonist Barbara Shermund.

On November 6, 1951, 49 members of the NCS arrived at Washington's Carlton Hotel for breakfast with Harry S. Truman. Gathered in Washington to help the Treasury Department sell Defense Stamps, the group presented Truman with a bound volume of their comic strip characters, some interacting with caricatures of Truman.

USO Tour and charitable causes
When Al Posen originated the idea of National Cartoonists Society tours to entertain American servicemen, he became the NCS Director of Overseas Shows. On October 4, 1952, nine cartoonists left on a USO-Camp Shows tour of U.S. Armed Forces installations in Europe, traveling via a Military Air Transport Service plane from Westover Air Force Base in Massachusetts and landing at Rhein-Main Air Base in Germany. On the tour, the cartoonists engaged models in each country to join in their Laff Time show of audience participation stunts and gags. The cartoonists were Posen, Charles Biro, Bob Dunn, Gus Edson, Bill Holman, Bob Montana, Russell Patterson, Clarence Russell and Dick Wingert (Hubert). The comic strip Dondi came about because of a friendship that developed between Edson and Irwin Hasen during a USO trip to Korea.

Hy Eisman described the atmosphere at the NCS when he joined in 1955:

During the 1960s, cartoonists of military comic strips went to the White House and met with Lyndon B. Johnson in the Oval Office. The group included Caniff, Bill Mauldin and Mort Walker.

In 1977–78, the National Cartoonists Society released The National Cartoonists Society Portfolio of Fine Comic Art, published by Collector's Press. The portfolio featured a total of 34 art prints. Each 12" x 16" print was printed on archival fine art paper.

In 2011, to memorialize and commemorate the 10th anniversary of the September 11 attacks, many NCS cartoonists auctioned off art that gave commentary to the tragedy and raised money for families victimized by the event in a reflective homage called, Cartoonists Remember. These cartoon tributes raised over $50,000 to benefit the 9/11 families. The art was featured and displayed in both nationally syndicated newspapers and museums across America, including the Newseum in Washington, DC, the Cartoon Art Museum in San Francisco and the Museum of Comic and Cartoon Art in New York City.

In 2005, the Society formed a Foundation to continue the charitable works of its fund for indigent cartoonists, the Milt Gross Fund.

The Society's offices are in Winter Park, Florida. In addition, the NCS has chartered 16 regional chapters throughout the United States and one in Canada. Chapter Chairpersons sit on the NCS Regional Council and are represented by a National Representative, who is a voting member of the Board of Directors. As NCS president for two consecutive terms, Jeff Keane, cartoonist for the Family Circus and son of comic creator, Bil Keane, returned to the charter and spirit of the NCS by extending the society's outreach to the military by visiting and cartooning for vets who served in the Iraq War and Afghanistan War, during the years 2007–2011.

In 2008, NCS joined over 60 other art licensing businesses (including the Artists Rights Society, Association of American Editorial Cartoonists, Society of Children's Book Writers and Illustrators, the Stock Artists Alliance, Illustrator's Partnership of America and the Advertising Photographers of America) in opposing both The Orphan Works Act of 2008 and the Shawn Bentley Orphan Works Act of 2008. Known collectively as "Artists United Against the U.S. Orphan Works Acts", the diverse organizations joined forces to oppose the bills, which the groups believe "permits, and even encourages, wide-scale infringements while depriving creators of protections currently available under the Copyright Act."

Billy DeBeck Memorial Award
The earliest NCS award was the Billy DeBeck Memorial Award, also known as "the Barney" from the character in Billy DeBeck's popular comic strip Barney Google and Snuffy Smith. After DeBeck died on Veteran's Day, 1942, Mary DeBeck remarried (as Mary Bergman) and created the DeBeck Award in 1946. She also made the annual presentation of engraved silver cigarette cases (with DeBeck's characters etched on the cover) to the eight winners spanning the years 1946 to 1953.

Mary Bergman died February 14, 1953, aboard a National Airlines DC-6 which went down in the Gulf of Mexico during a thunderstorm on a flight from Tampa to New Orleans. In 1954, following her death, the DeBeck Award was renamed the Reuben Award, also known "the Reuben." When the award name was changed in 1954, all of the prior eight winners were given Reuben statuettes designed by and named after the NCS' first president, Rube Goldberg. The Reuben Award was executed in bronze by sculptor and editorial cartoonist Bill Crawford.

Reuben Award 
The National Cartoonists Society's Reuben Awards weekend is an annual gala event which takes place at a site selected by the President. During the formal, black-tie banquet evening, the Reuben Award (determined by secret ballot) is presented to the Outstanding Cartoonist of the Year. Cartoonists in various professional divisions are also honored with special plaques for excellence. These awards are voted by a combination of the general membership (by secret ballot) and specially-formed juries overseen by various NCS Regional Chapters. A cartoonist does not need to be a member of the NCS to receive one of the Society's awards.

Prior to 1983, the Reuben Awards Dinner was held in New York City, usually at the Plaza Hotel. Since then, the event has expanded into a full weekend and is held in a different city each year. Recent Reuben locations have included New York City; Boca Raton; San Francisco; Cancún; Kansas City, Missouri; Las Vegas; and Pittsburgh, Pennsylvania in 2013.

Each year, during the NCS Annual Reuben Awards Weekend, the Society honors the year's outstanding achievements in all walks of the profession. Excellence in the fields of newspaper strips, newspaper panels, TV animation, feature animation, newspaper illustration, gag cartoons, book illustration, greeting cards, comic books, magazine feature/magazine illustration and editorial cartoons, is honored in the NCS Division Awards, which are chosen by specially-convened juries at the chapter level. An Online Comic Strip Award was added in 2011.

The recipient of the profession's highest honor, the Reuben Award for Outstanding Cartoonist of the Year, is chosen by a secret ballot of the members. As part of the presentations and general frivolity, the NCS has produced videos to initiate the festivities, some of which have been parodies of iconic entertainment.

Award winners

Billy DeBeck Memorial Award

1946: Milton Caniff, Terry and the Pirates
1947: Al Capp, Li'l Abner
1948: Chic Young, Blondie
1949: Alex Raymond, Rip Kirby
1950: Roy Crane, Buz Sawyer
1951: Walt Kelly, Pogo
1952: Hank Ketcham, Dennis the Menace
1953: Mort Walker, Beetle Bailey

Reuben Award

1954: Willard Mullin, Sports
1955: Charles M. Schulz, Peanuts
1956: Herbert L. Block (Herblock), Editorial
1957: Hal Foster, Prince Valiant
1958: Frank King, Gasoline Alley
1959: Chester Gould, Dick Tracy
1960: Ronald Searle, Advertising and Illustration
1961: Bill Mauldin, Editorial
1962: Dik Browne, Hi and Lois
1963: Fred Lasswell, Barney Google
1964: Charles M. Schulz, Peanuts (First Repeat Winner)
1965: Leonard Starr, Mary Perkins, On Stage
1966: Otto Soglow, The Little King
1967: Rube Goldberg, Humor in Sculpture
1968: Pat Oliphant, Editorial, and Johnny Hart, B.C. and The Wizard of Id (First Tied Winners)
1969: Walter Berndt, Smitty
1970: Alfred Andriola, Kerry Drake
1971: Milton Caniff, Steve Canyon
1972: Pat Oliphant, Editorial (Second Repeat Winner)
1973: Dik Browne, Hägar the Horrible (Third Repeat Winner)
1974: Dick Moores, Gasoline Alley
1975: Bob Dunn, They'll Do It Every Time
1976: Ernie Bushmiller, Nancy
1977: Chester Gould, Dick Tracy (Fourth Repeat Winner)
1978: Jeff MacNelly, Editorial
1979: Jeff MacNelly, Shoe (Fifth Repeat Winner, First "back-to-back" Winner)
1980: Charles Saxon, Advertising
1981: Mell Lazarus, Miss Peach and Momma
1982: Bil Keane, The Family Circus
1983: Arnold Roth, Advertising
1984: Brant Parker, The Wizard of Id
1985: Lynn Johnston, For Better or For Worse (First Female (& Canadian) Winner)
1986: Bill Watterson, Calvin and Hobbes
1987: Mort Drucker, Mad
1988: Bill Watterson, Calvin and Hobbes (Sixth Repeat Winner)
1989: Jim Davis, Garfield
1990: Gary Larson, The Far Side
1991: Mike Peters, Mother Goose and Grimm
1992: Cathy Guisewite, Cathy
1993: Jim Borgman, Editorial
1994: Gary Larson, The Far Side (Seventh Repeat Winner)
1995: Garry Trudeau, Doonesbury
1996: Sergio Aragonés, Mad
1997: Scott Adams, Dilbert
1998: Will Eisner, The Spirit
1999: Patrick McDonnell, Mutts
2000: Jack Davis, Mad
2001: Jerry Scott, Zits and Baby Blues
2002: Matt Groening, Life in Hell
2003: Greg Evans, Luann
2004: Pat Brady, Rose Is Rose
2005: Mike Luckovich, editorial cartoonist for The Atlanta Journal-Constitution
2006: Bill Amend, FoxTrot
2007: Al Jaffee, Mad
2008: Dave Coverly, Speed Bump
2009: Dan Piraro, Bizarro
2010: Richard Thompson, Cul de Sac
2011: Tom Richmond, Mad
2012: Rick Kirkman, Baby Blues and Brian Crane, Pickles (Second Tied Winners)
2013: Wiley Miller, Non Sequitur
2014: Roz Chast, editorial cartoonist for The New Yorker
2015: Michael Ramirez, editorial cartoonist for Creators Syndicate
2016: Ann Telnaes, syndicated with Cartoonists and Writers Syndicate/New York Times Syndicate
2017: Glen Keane, Walt Disney feature films
2018: Stephan Pastis, Pearls Before Swine
2019: Lynda Barry, Making Comics
2020: Ray Billingsley, Curtis
2021: Edward Sorel, cartoonist and satirist

Other awards

Ace (Amateur Cartoonist Extraordinary) Award

1961 Arne Rhode
1962 Carol Burnett
1963 Hugh Hefner
1963 Jonathan Winters
1964 Chuck McCann
196? Cliff Arquette
1967 Jackie Gleason
1970 Orson Bean
1972 Bobby Day
1973 Robert Lansing
1974 Jane Powell
1975 Rita Moreno
197? Boyd Lewis
1979 Linda Gialeanella
1980 Ginger Rogers
1981 Claire Trevor
1990 John Updike
1991 Al Roker
1992 Tom Wolfe
1993 Pete Hamill
1996 Denis Leary
1998 Morley Safer
2014 "Weird Al" Yankovic
2018 Jake Tapper

Award of Honor
This award was for recognition of the American cartoon as an instrument in war, peace, education and in the artistic betterment of our cultural environment. On September 22, 1965, the following were honored:

General Omar N. Bradley
Walter Cronkite
John C. Daly
John Cameron Swayze

Gold Key Award (National Cartoonists Society Hall of Fame)

1977 Hal Foster
1978 Edwina Dumm
1979 Raeburn Van Buren
1979 Herbert Block
1980 Rube Goldberg (posthumous)
1981 Milton Caniff
2000 Arnold Roth
2005 Larry Katzman
2006 Mort Walker
2011 Stan Goldberg

Milton Caniff Lifetime Achievement Award
The Milton Caniff Lifetime Achievement Award is awarded by unanimous vote of the NCS Board of Directors.

1994 Harry Devlin
1994 Will Eisner
1995 Al Hirschfeld
1996 Jack Davis
1997 Dale Messick
1998 Bill Gallo
1999 Charles M. Schulz
2002 Jerry Robinson
2003 Morrie Turner
2004 Jules Feiffer
2005 Gahan Wilson
2006 Ralph Steadman
2007 Sandra Boynton
2008 Frank Frazetta
2009
Joe Kubert
George Booth
2010 R. O. Blechman
2012 Brad Anderson
2013 Russ Heath
2015 Paul Coker, Jr.
2016 Angelo Torres
2017 Lynda Barry
2018 Floyd Norman
2019 Hy Eisman

Gold T-Square Award
The Gold T-Square is awarded for 50 years as professional cartoonist.

1955 Rube Goldberg
1999 Mort Walker
2018 Arnold Roth

Silver T-Square Award
The Silver T-Square is awarded, by unanimous vote of the NCS Board of Directors, to persons who have demonstrated outstanding dedication or service to the Society or the profession.

1948 David Low
1949
Carl Ed
Cliff Sterrett
H.C. "Bud" Fisher
Frank King
George McManus
1950
Harry S. Truman
John Snyder
James Berryman
Martin Branner
1951 Red Manning
1953 Ed Kuekes
1954
Dwight D. Eisenhower
George M. Humphrey
Herbert Block
1956
James Thurber
Gluyas Williams
Al Posen
Al Pierotti
1957
Harry Hershfield
Tom Little
Milton Caniff
Bob Dunn
1958 Russell Patterson
1959
Carl Rose
Bill Mauldin
1960
Ben Roth (posthumous)
McGowan Miller
1961
Mort Walker
Joe Musial
1962 Edmund Valtman
1963 Steve Douglas
1964
Tom Gill
Vernon Greene
1967 Al Smith
1969
Otto Soglow
Irwin Hasen
Dick Ericson
1970
Alfred Andriola
George Wunder
1971
Dick Hodgins Sr.
Frank Fogarty
1972
Walt Kelly
John Norment
David Pascal
Larry Katzman
1973
Bill Crawford
John Fischetti
Jack Tippit
1974
Isadore Klein
"Tack" Knight
1975
Jack Rosen
Hal Foster
1976 Al Kilgore
1977
Bill Kresse
Paul Szep
Lyman Young
1978
Bill Gallo
Jim Ruth
Hank Ketcham
1979
Dick Hodgins Jr.
Sylvan Byck
Ed Mitchell
Jim Ivey
1980 Buck Peters
1981 John Cullen Murphy
1982 George Wolfe
1984 Sam Norkin
1986 Lee Falk
1992
Creig Flessel
Herb Jacoby
1993 George Breisacher
1995 Arnold Roth and Caroline Roth
1996
David Folkman
Bill Janocha
1997 Tim Rosenthal
1998 Joe Duffy
2000 Mel Lazarus
2001
Ted Goff
Frank Pauer
2002
Bil Keane
Joseph D'Angelo
2003
Jud Hurd
John McMeel
2004 (no award)
2005 Dick Locher
2006 Joe and Luke McGarry
2007 Stu Rees
2008 James Kemsley (posthumous)
2009 Jeff Bacon
2010 Lucy Caswell (for involvement in the Billy Ireland Cartoon Library & Museum)
2011 Steve McGarry
2012 Lee Salem
2014 Jeff Keane
2015 Bruce Higdon
2018
Brendan Burford
Rick Stromoski

Elzie Segar Award
This award was presented to a person who made a unique and outstanding contribution to the profession of cartooning.
The winner was selected by the NCS Board and later by King Features Syndicate, in honor of "Popeye" creator Elzie Segar.

 1971 Milton Caniff
 1972 Otto Soglow
 1973 Dik Browne
 1974 Russell Patterson
 1975 Bob Dunn
 1976 Bill Gallo
 1977 Mort Walker
 1978 Hal Foster
 1979 Al Capp (posthumous)
 1980 Charles M. Schulz
 1981 Johnny Hart
 1982 Bil Keane
 1983 John Cullen Murphy
 1984 Fred Lasswell
 1985 Jim Davis
 1986 Brant Parker
 1987 Mike Peters
 1994 Fred Lasswell
 1996 Tom Armstrong
 1999 Mort Walker

No. 1 (Sports Personality of the Year) Awards

1968 Ralph Houk
1970 Gil Hodges
1971 Jack Dempsey and Joan Whitney Payson (tie)
1972 Leroy "Satchel" Paige
1974 Rocky Graziano
1974 Monte Irwin
197? Casey Stengel
19?? Pearl Bailey
19?? Yogi Berra
19?? Dave DeBusschere
19?? Reggie Jackson
19?? Willis Reed
1984 Phil Rizzuto

Presidents

 1946–1948 Rube Goldberg
 1948–1949 Milton Caniff
 1950–1952 Alex Raymond
 1952–1953 Russell Patterson
 1953–1954 Otto Soglow
 1954–1956 Walt Kelly
 1956–1957 Harry Devlin
 1957–1959 John Pierotti
 1959–1960 Mort Walker
 1960–1961 Bill Crawford
 1961–1963 Bill Holman
 1963–1965 Dik Browne
 1965–1967 Bob Dunn
 1967–1969 Jerry Robinson
 1969–1971 Al Smith
 1971–1973 Jack Tippit
 1973–1977 Bill Gallo
 1977–1979 Burne Hogarth
 1979–1981 John Cullen Murphy
 1981–1983 Bil Keane
 1983–1985 Arnold Roth
 1985–1987 Frank Evers
 1987–1988 Bill Hoest
 1988 Bill Rechin
 1988–1989 Lynn Johnston
 1989–1993 Mell Lazarus
 1993–1995 Bruce Beattie
 1995–1997 Frank Springer
 1997–1999 George Breisacher
 1999–2001 Daryl Cagle
 2001–2005 Steve McGarry
 2005–2007 Rick Stromoski
 2007–2011 Jeff Keane
 2011–2015 Tom Richmond
 2015–2019 Bill Morrison
 2019– Jason Chatfield

See also
Allan Holtz
Billy Ireland Cartoon Library & Museum
Daily comic strip
Fred Waring Cartoon Collection
List of comic strip syndicates
List of newspaper comic strips
National Cartoonist Day
Sunday strip
Cartoon Art Museum

References

External links

NCS cartoonists USO trip: Kuwait

Cartooning
Comics groups and collectives
American artist groups and collectives
1946 establishments in the United States
Arts organizations established in 1946